The 2009–10 LNAH season was the 14th season of the Ligue Nord-Américaine de Hockey (before 2004 the Quebec Semi-Pro Hockey League), a minor professional league in the Canadian province of Quebec. Seven teams participated in the regular season, and CRS Express de Saint-Georges won the league title.

Regular season

Coupe Futura-Playoffs 
Won by CRS Express de Saint-Georges.

External links 
 Statistics on hockeydb.com

LNAH
3